Pingüino (in Spanish for "penguin") and pinguino (in Italian) or Pingüinos (Spanish for "penguins") may refer to:

CVV 1 Pinguino, a 1930s Italian glider
General Avia F.22 Pinguino, a 1990s civilian airplane
Penguin Island (South Shetland Islands), Antarctica, also known as Isla Pinguino
Los Pingüinos Natural Monument, Chile
Santiago Amador (born 1964), Colombian retired road racing cyclist nicknamed "Pinguino"
Carlos "Patato" Valdes (1926-2007), Cuban-born American conga player also known as "Pingüino"
El Pingüino, a 1973 album and track by Johnny Ventura, a Dominican singer and band leader
El Pingüino (newspaper) - see List of newspapers in Chile
Hostess CupCake, sold in Mexico as "Pingüinos"
Pinguino (ship), a cargo ship shipwrecked in 1967 - see List of shipwrecks of South America#Brazil
ST Pinguino, a tug shipwrecked on 16 September 1927 - List of shipwrecks in 1927